USCCB Publishing is a publisher that participates in the mission of the United States Conference of Catholic Bishops as a professional publishing resource in the areas of print and electronic media and intellectual property management. It seeks to effectively use resources and technology to assist the bishops in proclaiming the Good News of Jesus and sharing the teachings of the Catholic Church.

External links
Official website

Publishing companies of the United States
Christian publishing companies